Rémi Pété (born 21 September 1987) is a French male canoeist who won medals at senior level at the Wildwater Canoeing World Championships.

He won a Wildwater Canoeing World Cup in K1.

References

External links
 Rémi Pété at LesSports.info

1987 births
Living people
French male canoeists
Place of birth missing (living people)